Kanggye station is a railway station in Kanggye municipal city, Chagang Province, North Korea, on the Manp'o Line of the Korean State Railway; it is also the starting point of the narrow-gauge Kanggye Line to Rangrim.

History

The station was opened on 1 December 1937 by the Chosen Government Railway, along with the rest of the seventh section of the Manp'o Line from Chŏnch'ŏn (now called Hwaam) to Kanggye.

References

Railway stations in North Korea